Coquet may refer to:

 a flirtatious female

Places
 River Coquet, a river of Northumberland
 Coquet Island

People
 Amélie Coquet (born 1984), French football player
 Ernie Coquet (1883–1946), English football full-back
 Henry of Coquet (died 1127), Danish hermit and Roman Catholic saint

See also
 Coquette (disambiguation)